Mormanno is a town and comune in the province of Cosenza in the Calabria region of southern Italy. It is located in the heart of the National Park of Pollino, near the course of the Lao River.

It is home to a Cathedral in Neapolitan-Baroque style, built in the 18th century.

Twin towns
 Savigliano, Italy

External links 
    
 Video on http://www.telecosenza.it  

Cities and towns in Calabria